The Ashley Gorge is a river gorge of the Ashley River / Rakahuri in Canterbury, New Zealand. The river is bridged at the mouth of the gorge by the Inland Scenic Route, formerly designated State Highway 72. A popular picnic ground and camping area is adjacent to the bridge. Upstream of the gorge the river flows through the Lees Valley.

Ashley Gorge is also the name of a small rural locality 2.5 km southwest of the bridge.

Demographics

Ashley Gorge had a population of 1,134 at the 2018 New Zealand census, an increase of 132 people (13.2%) since the 2013 census, and an increase of 444 people (64.3%) since the 2006 census. There were 420 households. There were 591 males and 543 females, giving a sex ratio of 1.09 males per female. The median age was 42.3 years (compared with 37.4 years nationally), with 225 people (19.8%) aged under 15 years, 177 (15.6%) aged 15 to 29, 585 (51.6%) aged 30 to 64, and 147 (13.0%) aged 65 or older.

Ethnicities were 95.8% European/Pākehā, 5.0% Māori, 1.1% Pacific peoples, 2.1% Asian, and 2.4% other ethnicities (totals add to more than 100% since people could identify with multiple ethnicities).

The proportion of people born overseas was 20.1%, compared with 27.1% nationally.

Although some people objected to giving their religion, 55.3% had no religion, 34.4% were Christian and 2.9% had other religions.

Of those at least 15 years old, 159 (17.5%) people had a bachelor or higher degree, and 171 (18.8%) people had no formal qualifications. The median income was $33,000, compared with $31,800 nationally. The employment status of those at least 15 was that 510 (56.1%) people were employed full-time, 150 (16.5%) were part-time, and 18 (2.0%) were unemployed.

References

Canyons and gorges of Canterbury, New Zealand
Waimakariri District